The scarlet macaw (Ara macao) is a large yellow, red and blue Central and South American parrot, a member of a large group of Neotropical parrots called macaws. It is native to humid evergreen forests of the Neotropics. Formerly, the northern extent of its range included southern Tamaulipas. In some areas, it has suffered local extinction because of habitat destruction, or capture for the parrot trade, but in other areas, it remains fairly common. It is the national bird of Honduras. Like its relative the blue-and-yellow macaw, the scarlet macaw is a popular bird in aviculture as a result of its striking plumage.

Taxonomy
The scarlet macaw was formally described by the Swedish naturalist Carl Linnaeus in 1758 in the tenth edition of his Systema Naturae under the binomial name Psittacus macao. The scarlet macaw is now placed in the genus Ara (Lacépède, 1799), one of 6 genera of Central and South American macaws.

The two subspecies can be recognized by size and color detail in the feathers on the wings:
 A. m. macao (Linnaeus, 1758): South American scarlet macaw, the nominate subspecies. In the wings the medium and secondary coverts have green tip.
 A. m. cyanopterus Wiedenfeld, 1995: North Central American scarlet macaw. The Central American scarlet macaw is larger and has blue on its wings instead of green.

Genetics 
In May 2013, it was announced that a team of scientists, led by Dr. Christopher M. Seabury and Dr. Ian Tizard of Texas A&M University had sequenced the complete genome of the scarlet macaw. Based on this genome, species-specific microsatellite genetic markers were developed to aid genetic studies throughout the range of the species. These genetic markers were later validated on the trace amount of DNA acquired from feathers, and applied to study red-and-green macaws in a tropical landscape where DNA can degrade very quickly. These markers were proved to be useful to study their population genetics and identification of individuals in the landscape of the Peruvian Amazon.

Description
The plumage is mostly scarlet, but the rump and tail-covert feathers are light blue, the greater upper wing coverts are yellow, the upper sides of the flight feathers of the wings are dark blue as are the ends of the tail feathers, and the undersides of the wing and tail flight feathers are dark red with metallic gold iridescence. Some individuals may have green in the wings.

There is bare white skin around the eye and from there to the bill. Tiny white feathers are contained on the face patch. The upper mandible is mostly pale horn in color and the lower is black. Juveniles have dark eyes; adults have light yellow eyes.

It is frequently confused with the slightly larger green-winged macaw, which has more distinct red lines in the face and no yellow in the wing.

Scarlet macaws make very loud, high and sometimes low-pitched, throaty squawks, squeaks and screams designed to carry many kilometers to call for their groups.

The scarlet macaw can live up to 75 or even 90 years in captivity, although a more typical lifespan is 40 to 50 years.

Behavior 
A typical sighting is of a single bird or a pair flying above the forest canopy, though in some areas flocks can be seen. They often gather at clay licks. Scarlet macaws communicate primarily through raucous honks; however, vocal communication is highly variable, and captive macaws are known to be adept mimics of human speech.

Feeding 
Wild scarlet macaws feed on fruits, nuts, seeds, flowers and nectar.

They also love to eat insects and larvae. They are seen feeding heavily on bugs, snails and foliage. Snails and bugs are great source of protein, as they need additional protein during breeding seasons.

In Costa Rica's Central Pacific they have learned to feed on introduced Teak trees (Tectona grandis) and Almond Beach Trees. Local non-profit organizations have planted hundreds of those trees along the coastline from the Tárcoles River basin to Esterillos Beach which had helped increase the population drastically. The combined efforts and the correct ecotourism has also an important role in the conservation of such majestic birds. Tour companies along the Tarcoles River and its mangroves have bet on the importance of birdwatching as an asset for the growth on its population.

Breeding 

While comparatively docile at most times of the year, scarlet macaws may be formidably aggressive during periods of breeding. Scarlet macaws are monogamous birds, with individuals remaining with one partner throughout their lives. The hen lays two or three white eggs in a large tree cavity. The female incubates the eggs for about five weeks, and the chicks fledge from the nest about 90 days after hatching and leave their parents about a year later. Juveniles reach sexual maturity at five years of age.

Distribution and habitat 
The South American range is extensive and covers the  Amazon  forest, extending to Peru east of the Andes, to Bolivia. In Bolivia, it is very present in the Aquicuana Reserve, located in the Beni Department, near the city of Riberalta, the Capital of the Bolivian Amazon.

In Central America, the range extends from extreme eastern and southern Mexico and Panama through Guatemala, El Salvador, Honduras and Belize, the island of Coiba and infrequently on the mainland of Panama, and in Costa Rica in isolated regions on the Pacific Coast; the Nicoya Peninsula the Carara National Park and Peninsula de Osa.

The scarlet macaw has escaped or been deliberately released in to Florida, but there is no evidence that the population is breeding and may only persist due to continuing releases or escapes.

Scarlet macaws inhabit humid lowland subtropical rain forests, open woodlands, river edges, and savannas.

Conservation status 
The habitat of scarlet macaws is also considered to have the greatest latitudinal range for any bird in the genus Ara, as the estimated maximum territorial range covers 6,700,000 km2. Nevertheless, the scarlet macaw's habitat is fragmented, and the bird is mostly confined to tiny populations scattered throughout its original range in Middle America. However, as they still occur in large numbers over most of their original range in South America, the species is classified by IUCN as least concern. Its wild population is currently estimated between 20,000 and 50,000 individuals.

Commercial international trade in the species (including parts and derivatives) is prohibited by the bird's listing under CITES Appendix 1 due to predation for the pet and cage bird trade.

The northern subspecies, A. m. cyanopterus, is listed as endangered by the USFWS. The USFWS estimates that only 2,000–3,000 birds of the northern subspecies remain in the wild.

Aviculture 
The scarlet macaw is an early example of a parrot breeding in captivity. Captive breeding occurred in Northern Mexico at Paquime (also called Casas Grandes) and very likely Southwest New Mexico Mimbres Valley in the 11th century. Breeding pens, perches, bones, and eggshell fragments have been uncovered. The straightforward nature of scarlet macaw breeding and the value of their plumes in trade created a market for trade wherein the animals were used in religious rites north to the Colorado Plateau region.

Today the scarlet macaw is found worldwide in captivity, but is best represented in captivity in the Americas. Captive techniques developed from the pet trade have positively affected wild populations: in areas with low macaws populations, the "extra" babies that typically die in the nest may be reared by humans hands and released into the wild to bolster the population, as has been done by the Tambopata Macaw Project. Their captive diet, egg incubation, assisted hatching, hand rearing, co-parenting, parent-rearing, fledgling, maturation, and breeding are well understood within the avicultural community (AFA Watchbird magazine).

See also 
 The Ara Project (macaw reintroduction)
 The Macaw Society
 List of macaws
 Iago (Disney)

References

External links 

 World Parrot Trust Parrot Encyclopedia — Species Profiles
 The Scarlet Macaw Genome Project
 Scarlet macaw videos on the Internet Bird Collection
 Stamps (15 countries) with RangeMap

 Ara macao conservation and reintroduction in Costa Rica

scarlet macaw
scarlet macaw
Birds of Central America
Birds of Colombia
Birds of the Amazon Basin
Birds of Ecuador
Birds of Venezuela
Birds of Trinidad and Tobago
Birds of the Caribbean
Talking birds
National symbols of Honduras
scarlet macaw
scarlet macaw
Articles containing video clips
Species endangered by the pet trade